The Battle of Gallipoli was fought at the end of 1312 or in 1313, between the Byzantines and the Turcopoles led by Halil Pasha. For two years, Thrace was occupied by Halil Pasha (or Halil Edje). Earlier, Byzantine Emperor Michael IX Palaiologos had raised an army which defeated the Turcopoles, and confined them to a fortified camp in the Gallipoli peninsula. These Turcopoles numbered less than 2,000. Michael next asked assistance from his son-in-law, Serbian King Stefan Milutin, and received a 2,000-strong Serbian cavalry troop (possibly Cumans or Serbian heavy cavalry). Milutin had earlier subdued the Turcopoles that took refuge in Serbia. The Byzantine and Genoese ships completed the blockade, the Genoese preventing the Turcopoles from escaping by sea. The Turcopoles first made unsuccessful attempts at breaking free, but decided to surrender to the Genoese, thinking they would not be harsh. However, in the night, by mistake, many Turcopoles fell into the hands of the Byzantines, who slaughtered them and took their belongings. The Genoese executed only those Turcopoles that had many valuables, so they could not get into the hands of the Byzantines, and the rest they sold as slaves. Halil and his men were all massacred. The Serbian contingent took share in the spoils. The Turcopoles had heavy casualties, with few survivors returning to Byzantine service, though little is heard of them afterwards. The victory was made a poem by Manuel Philes. In two chrysobulls of Andronikos II Palaiologos to the Serbian Hilandar monastery, dating to October 1313 and July 1317, he showed gratitude to Stefan Milutin for his aid, as detailed in the prefaces.

Notes

References

Sources

Gallipoli 1312
Gallipoli
1312 in Europe
Gallipoli 1312
History of the Gallipoli Peninsula
1310s in the Byzantine Empire
Gallipoli 1312